Viktor Sergeyevich Lopatyonok (born 18 February 1984) is a former Russian footballer.

Club career
He played in the Russian Football National League for FC Petrotrest Saint Petersburg in 2005.

External links
 
 
  Profile at Sportbox

1984 births
Living people
Russian footballers
Association football defenders
Association football midfielders
FC Zenit-2 Saint Petersburg players
FC Petrotrest players
FC Dynamo Vologda players